London District Signals was a headquarters signal unit of the Royal Engineers (RE) and later Royal Corps of Signals in Britain's Territorial Army from 1908. It served with a corps headquarters at Gallipoli and on the Western Front during World War I, and later became an air defence signal unit during World War II. Its successor unit continues in the Army Reserve today.

Origin
When the Territorial Force was created in 1908 as a result of the Haldane Reforms, the London Division, Electrical Engineers of the Royal Engineers (Volunteers) spun off three telegraph companies, later termed signal companies:
 London Wireless Signal Company
 London Cable Signal Company
 London Air-Line Signal Company
Together, these companies formed London District Signals, defined as 'Army Troops RE' in the TF organisation, serving HQ London District based at Horse Guards. The unit headquarters was at 12 Palmer Street, Westminster.

World War I
On the outbreak of war in August 1914 the London Wireless Signal Company was temporarily attached to 1st Mounted Division, but had left by March 1915. On 3 November 1914 a London Motor Airline Section embarked for the Western Front. In June 1915, London District Signals joined IX Corps HQ forming at the Tower of London and went to Gallipoli as IX Corps Signals. After the evacuation from Gallipoli, the Corps HQ went to France and served on the Western Front until the end of the war. The Corps Signals also ran a Signals Training Centre.

Interwar

When the renamed Territorial Army (TA) was reconstituted in 1920, London District Signals was reformed as 1st London Corps Signals (Army Troops) in the Royal Corps of Signals. It was retitled as Anti-Aircraft Signals in 1922, and then Air Defence Signals in 1925 when it formed 26th (London) and 27th (London) Anti-Aircraft Brigade Signals Companies. When 1st Anti-Aircraft Division was formed at RAF Uxbridge in 1935 (with 26 and 27 AA Bdes under command), the unit provided the signals component. It was based at 46 Regency Street, the former Drill Hall of the London Electrical Engineers. The divisional signals unit was duplicated for 6th Anti-Aircraft Division in 1939 when the TA doubled in size after the Munich Crisis. 6th AA Division took responsibility for the air defence of the Thames estuary, Essex and North Kent, with its HQ at RAF Uxbridge.  Just before mobilisation, the regiment organised as:

 Regimental Headquarters at Regency Street, London commanded by Lieutenant Colonel A. Hemsley, MBE, TD
 No.1, 2, and 3 Signal Companies at Regency Street, London
 Cadet Affiliation — 'D' Company, 1st West London Cadet Corps

World War II
Together, 1st and 6th AA Divisions defended London and the Thames Estuary during The Blitz. As the war developed, increasing numbers of women from the Auxiliary Territorial Service (ATS) became integrated into AA and signals units, which were termed 'Mixed'. By June 1942, the composition of the two units was as follows:

1st AA Divisional Signals
 Commanding Officer: Lieutenant-Colonel A. Hemsley, MBE, TD (1939–45)
 1st AA Divisional Mixed Signal Unit HQ
 HQ No 1 Company:
 1 AA Command Mixed Signal Office Section
 1 AA Division Mixed Signal Office Section
 26 AA Brigade Signal Office Mixed Sub-Section
 38 AA Brigade Signal Office Mixed Sub-Section
 48 AA Brigade Signal Office Mixed Sub-Section
 49 AA Brigade Signal Office Mixed Sub-Section
 HQ No 2 Company:
 601 AA Gun Operations Room (Class 'D') Mixed Signal Section
 315 AA Gun Operations Room (Class 'B') Mixed Signal Section
 112 RAF Fighter Sector Sub-Section 
 5 AA Line Maintenance Section

1st AA Divisional Signals had provided Anti-Aircraft Command's Signals section since the latter's establishment in 1938. Between 1940 and 1942, both 1st and 6th AA Divisions came under 1st Aa Corps, but from June 1942, 1st AA Division was directly under AA Command HQ.

6th AA Divisional Signals
 Commanding Officer: Lieutenant-Colonel G.J. Morley-Peel, MBE, TD (1939–44)
 6th AA Divisional Mixed Signal Unit HQ
 HQ No 1 Company:
 6 AA Division Mixed Signal Office Section
 6 AA Brigade Signal Office Mixed Sub-Section
 102 RAF Fighter Sector Sub-Section 
 103 RAF Fighter Sector Sub-Section 
 329 AA Gun Operations Room (Class 'B') Mixed Signal Section
 37 AA Brigade Signal Office Mixed Sub-Section
 309 AA Gun Operations Room (Class 'B') Mixed Signal Section
 15 AA Line Maintenance Section
 HQ No 2 Company:
 328 AA Gun Operations Room (Class 'B') Mixed Signal Section
 28 AA Brigade Signal Office Mixed Sub-Section
 56 AA Brigade Signal Office Mixed Sub-Section
 101 RAF Fighter Sector Sub-Section 
 310 AA Gun Operations Room (Class 'B') Mixed Signal Section
 71 AA Brigade Signal Office Mixed Sub-Section
 16 AA Line Maintenance Section

When AA Command was reorganised in October 1942 the two divisions became 1 AA Group and 2 AA Group, with the signals units renamed 1st and 2nd AA Group (Mixed) Signals. The two groups operated alongside No. 11 Group RAF and took a leading role in defence against V-1 flying bombs (Operation Diver) in 1944–45.

Postwar
On the re-establishment of the TA in 1947, 1 and 2 AA Group Signals re-merged and were numbered 11 AA (Mixed) Signal Regiment, 'Mixed' now indicating that members of the Women's Royal Army Corps (successors to the ATS) were integrated into the unit. The new unit was based at Kensington. The unit was retained when AA Command was disbanded in 1955, becoming Eastern Command Mixed Signal Regiment, the East Anglian District Signal Regiment of the Army Emergency Reserve (AER). Eastern Command Signal Regiment was numbered 83 Signal Regiment in 1959.

Meanwhile, elements of 11 AA Signal Rgt joined the disbanding 259 (Home Counties) (Cinque Ports) Heavy Anti-Aircraft Regiment, Royal Artillery to form Home Counties District (Mixed) Signal Regiment with HQ at Shorncliffe. This became 62 (Mixed) Signal Regiment (Cinque Ports), and merged with 44 (Home Counties) Signal Regiment in 1961.

The size of the TA was reduced in 1967, when 83 Signal Regiment (AER) became 83 Signal Squadron (Volunteers) and later 83 Support Squadron in 31 (City of London) Signal Regiment, which was disbanded in 2010.

In 2010, 83 Support Sqn was renamed 47 Signal Troop, (recognising the former 47th (2nd London) Division) and became part of 71 (City of London Yeomanry) Signal Regiment. The Troop is based in Uxbridge and Southfields.

Honorary Colonel
The first Honorary Colonel of London District Signals was Col A. Bain, TD, MICE, MIEE, appointed on 14 July 1912.

Footnotes

Notes

References
 Maj A.F. Becke,History of the Great War: Order of Battle of Divisions, Part 2a: The Territorial Force Mounted Divisions and the 1st-Line Territorial Force Divisions (42–56), London: HM Stationery Office, 1935/Uckfield: Naval & Military Press, 2007, ISBN 1-847347-39-8.
 Maj A.F. Becke,History of the Great War: Order of Battle of Divisions, Part 4: The Army Council, GHQs, Armies, and Corps 1914–1918, London: HM Stationery Office, 1944/Uckfield: Naval & Military Press, 2007, .
 Cliff Lord & Graham Watson, Royal Corps of Signals: Unit Histories of the Corps (1920–2001) and its Antecedents, Solihull: Helion, 2003, .
 Maj-Gen R.F.H Nalder, The Royal Corps of Signals: A History of its Antecedents and Developments (Circa 1800–1955), London: Royal Signals Institution, 1958.
 Titles and Designations of Formations and Units of the Territorial Army, London: War Office, 7 November 1927.

Online sources
 Air Formation Signals Association
 British Army website
 British Military History
 Great War Forum 
 Graham Watson, The Territorial Army 1947

Signal units of the Royal Engineers
Units and formations of the Royal Corps of Signals
Military units and formations in London
Military units and formations established in 1908
1908 establishments in the United Kingdom